Prunella is a 1918 American silent romantic fantasy film directed by Maurice Tourneur. The film is based on the 1906 play Prunella, or, Love in a Dutch Garden  by Laurence Housman and Harley Granville-Barker, and stars Marguerite Clark in the title role. Clark also starred in the 1913 Winthrop Ames produced Broadway stage production on which the film is based. The majority of the film is considered lost, with only fragments still in existence.

Plot
As described in a film magazine, Prunella (Clark), who lives in a garden with her three aunts Prim (Berwin), Prude (Harris) and Privacy (Cecil), is carefully guarded from the outside world until the day a troupe of travelling players comes to town. Pierrot (Raucourt), the leader, creeps into the garden and captivates Prunella's heart. She runs off with him and becomes his Pierrette. For two years they wander from country to country. Pierrot tires of his marriage vows and runs away. He finds what a miserable thing life is without her, and he returns to the Dutch gardens and finds her, is forgiven, and they live on, presumably in blissful happiness.

Cast
 Marguerite Clark as Prunella
 Isabel Berwin  as Prim
 Nora Cecil as Privacy
 William J. Gross as The Gardener
 Marcia Harris as Prude
 Charles Hartley as The Gardener
 Arthur Kennedy as The Gardener's Boy
 Henry Leoni as Scaramel 
 Jules Raucourt (Fr) as Pierrot
 A. Voorhees Wood as The Gardener

References

External links
 
 
 Housman, Laurence, Granville-Barker, Harley, Prunella; or, Love in a Dutch Garden, New York: Duffield and Company, 1913 edition, on the Internet Archive

1918 films
1918 lost films
1910s romantic fantasy films
American romantic fantasy films
American silent feature films
American black-and-white films
Famous Players-Lasky films
Films directed by Maurice Tourneur
American films based on plays
Lost American films
1910s American films